The Airco DH.6 was a British military trainer biplane used by the Royal Flying Corps during the First World War. Known by various nicknames, including the "Clutching hand" and "Skyhook", many survived to be used as a civil light aircraft in the postwar era.

Design and development
The DH.6 was specifically designed as a military trainer, at a time when it was usual for obsolete service types to be used in this role. Geoffrey de Havilland seems to have had two design criteria in mind. The first was that it should be inexpensive and easy to build, and above all, simple to repair after the mishaps common in training units. The top and bottom wings were square-cut and interchangeable, hence roundels often located in unusual positions. They were heavily cambered, and braced with cables rather than streamlined wires. On the original version of the type there was no stagger. Even the fin and rudder, on the prototype of the usual curved de Havilland outline, were cut square on production machines. The fuselage structure was a straight box with no attempt at refinement of outline – instructor and pupil sat in tandem on basketwork seats in a single cockpit, spartan even by the standards of the time. The standard engine was the readily available 90 hp (67 kW) RAF 1a. Because of its use in the B.E.2 the engine was familiar to RFC mechanics. No cowling was used, and upswept straight exhaust pipes were fitted. When stocks of the RAF 1a ran short, other engines were fitted, including the 80 hp (60 kW) Renault.

The second design criterion was that the new trainer should be relatively safe to fly, both for the student and his instructor.
RFC instructors at the time referred to student pilots as "Huns" (the term normally applied to German airmen) and casualties at training schools were high. To improve safety the instructor could decouple the student's controls to avoid having to wrestle with him. The new trainer's flying characteristics were selected to achieve the desired safety. De Havilland had carried out extensive research into stability and control in aircraft while with the Royal Aircraft Factory, which helped in designing a safe but deliberately unstable aircraft.

In fact, the DH.6 was described as "too safe" to make a good trainer, as its reaction to inexpert piloting was too gentle to prepare pilots for combat aircraft such as the Sopwith Camel, whose handling was unusually difficult even for the era. With its low power, strong construction and lack of streamlining, its maximum speed was very low.

Wartime production
At least 2,282 DH.6s were built in the UK during the war, out of orders of about 3,000. Besides Airco, batches were built by Grahame-White, Kingsbury Aviation, Harland and Wolff, Morgan, Savages, Ransomes, Sims & Jefferies, and Gloucestershire. A single DH.6 was constructed in July 1917 by Canadian Aeroplanes Ltd. as a prototype for projected production, should supply of the Curtiss JN-4 (Can)  prove inadequate, and it was the first British-designed aircraft built in Canada. In the event, the expected shortage of "Canucks" never materialized and only one example was built.

Operational history
In 1917, training of RFC pilots began to receive a long overdue overhaul. The School of Special Flying at Gosport in Hampshire was established by Maj. Robert R. Smith-Barry with the aim of making flight instructors into specially trained experts – rather than entrusting the role to novices who had barely completed their own training, and operational pilots being "rested" to recover from combat fatigue. The Avro 504K was adopted as the standard trainer by the end of 1917, with the DH.6 becoming surplus as far as training was concerned.

At the end of 1917, about 300 DH.6s were transferred to the RNAS for anti-submarine patrols. While far from ideal for this work, the type proved surprisingly "seaworthy", being known to float for as long as ten hours after ditching. On operations, the underpowered trainer could not carry both an observer and weaponry. The majority of patrols were flown solo, allowing a token bomb load and a lightweight radio installation to be carried, although convoy escort missions generally carried an observer who could communicate with ships using an Aldis lamp. The "built in" instability designed to keep a student pilot alert proved tiring for pilots on long patrols over water, and experimental changes were made in mid-1918 to improve stability. These included the introduction of 10 in (25 cm) of back-stagger to wings of reduced chord and camber, with narrower elevators and rudder. DH.6s modified to this standard were unofficially dubbed "DH 6As".

1050 DH.6s were still on charge with the RAF on 31 October 1918.

Nicknames
Many RFC/RAF aircraft of this period received nicknames (some of which, like the "zoo" names of Sopwith types, reached semi-official status), and the DH.6 has a variety of humorous but disrespectful epithets. The reactions of novice pilots were probably behind it being called the "clutching hand". Australian airmen may have been referring to its lack of speed when calling it "skyhook", although the shape of the exhaust pipes has also been mentioned. Other nicknames for the type included "crab," "clockwork mouse," "flying coffin" and "dung hunter" (these last two on account of the shape of the plywood cockpit, thought to resemble either a coffin or an outside toilet).

Postwar and civil use
There was no place for the DH.6 in the postwar RAF, and survivors were sold off as surplus. In 1919, many went to civilian operators – especially for "joy riding". Some were exported to South Africa and the Point Cook-based aircraft were sold in Australia, where they continued flying into the late 1930s.

One example was exported to New Zealand for use by the Walsh brothers’ New Zealand Flying School and first flew there in February 1920, however it was damaged by a gale in August the same year and was never repaired.

Some 60 aircraft were licence-built in Spain from 1921 onwards with Hispano-Suiza 8 engines, refined fuselages that included separate cockpits, and rounded "de Havilland style" rudder/fin assemblies. At least some of these found their way into the inventory of two Spanish Air Force training establishments.

A DH.6 became the first powered aircraft to be owned by a British Scout Troop, when it was presented to 3rd Hampden (Middlesex) Scouts in 1921.

Variants
DH.6
Two-seat training aircraft.
DH.6A
Modified to improve stability for patrol duties.

Operators
 – Australian Flying Corps
 No. 5 (Training) Squadron AFC in the United Kingdom.
 No. 7 (Training) Squadron AFC in the United Kingdom.
 Central Flying School AFC at Point Cook, Victoria.

 Hellenic Naval Air Service

 New Zealand Flying School

 Spanish Air Force

 Royal Flying Corps / Royal Air Force
 No. 67 Squadron RAF
 No. 99 Squadron RAF
 No. 105 Squadron RAF
 No. 110 Squadron RAF
 No. 144 Squadron RAF
 No. 187 Squadron RAF
 No. 190 Squadron RAF
 No. 236 Squadron RAF
 No. 244 Squadron RAF
 No. 250 Squadron RAF
 No. 251 Squadron RAF
 No. 252 Squadron RAF
 No. 253 Squadron RAF
 No. 254 Squadron RAF
 No. 255 Squadron RAF
 No. 256 Squadron RAF
 No. 258 Squadron RAF
 No. 260 Squadron RAF
 No. 272 Squadron RAF
 No. 274 Squadron RAF
 Royal Naval Air Service

Specifications (DH.6)

See also

References

Notes

Bibliography
 Baker, David. William Avery "Billy" Bishop: The Man and the Aircraft He Flew. London: The Outline Press, 1990. .
 Boughton, Terence. The Story of the British Light Aeroplane. London: John Murray, 1963. 
 Bruce, J.M. British Aeroplanes 1914–18. London: Putnam, 1957. 
 Cheesman, E.F. Reconnaissance and Bomber Aircraft of the 1914–1918 War. Letchworth, UK: Harleyford Publications, 1962. 
 Jackson, A.J. de Havilland Aircraft since 1909. London: Putnam & Company Ltd., 1987. .
 Jackson, A.J. de Havilland Aircraft since 1915. London: Putnam & Company Ltd., 1962. 
 Jones, H.A. The War In The Air: Being the story of the part played in the Great War by the Royal Air Force: Volume VI. London: Clarendon Press, 1937. 
 Robertson, Bruce. AMC DH6 (Windsock Datafile 103). Berkhamsted, Herts, UK: Albatros Productions, Ltd., 2004. .
 Taylor, John W.R. "Airco DH.6". Combat Aircraft of the World from 1909 to the Present. New York: G.P. Putnam's Sons, 1969. .
 Taylor, Michael J.H. Jane's Encyclopedia of Aviation. London: Studio Editions, 1989, p. 45. .

DH.006
1910s British military trainer aircraft
Single-engined tractor aircraft
Biplanes with negative stagger
Aircraft first flown in 1916